Eva Loweová-Orvošová (born 18 January 1971) is a mountain bike rider and road cyclist from Slovakia. She represented her nation at the 1996 Summer Olympics on the road in the women's road race and on the mountain bike in the women's cross-country.

References

External links
 profile at sports-reference.com

Slovak female cyclists
Cyclists at the 1996 Summer Olympics
Olympic cyclists of Slovakia
Living people
Sportspeople from Liptovský Mikuláš
1971 births